Cayo North is an electoral constituency in the Cayo District represented in the House of Representatives of the National Assembly of Belize by Michel Chebat of the People’s United Party (PUP).

Profile
The Cayo North constituency was created for the 1961 general election as part of a major nationwide redistricting. The constituency is based in the northwestern corner of Cayo District. It includes the southern part of San Ignacio as well as the villages of Bullet Tree Falls and Paslow Falls.

Joseph Mahmud of the People's United Party, who was elected in the 2012 election, unexpectedly resigned in November 2014. A by-election was held on 5 January 2015 to elect Mahmud's successor. The by-election was only the third in Belize since independence, preceded by by-elections in Freetown (January 1993) and Cayo South (October 2003). Candidate nominations closed on 15 December 2014 with PUP nominee Richard Harrison and UDP nominee Omar Figueroa qualifying. No third party candidates appeared on the ballot. Figueroa won the by-election by a nearly 2-to-1 margin, increasing the UDP's overall majority in the Belize House.

Area Representatives

Elections

References

British Honduras Legislative Assembly constituencies established in 1961
Political divisions in Belize
Cayo North
1961 establishments in British Honduras